Kelsey Turnbow (born January 10, 1999) is an American soccer player who plays as a forward for San Diego Wave FC of the National Women's Soccer League (NWSL), the highest division of women's professional soccer in the United States. She began her professional career with Wave FC following an accomplished collegiate career with Santa Clara.

Early life
Turnbow played high school soccer for Central Valley High School in Spokane Valley, Washington and Pinnacle High School in Phoenix, Arizona. She also regularly played for the U.S. youth national teams.

Santa Clara
Turnbow helped Santa Clara win the 2020 NCAA Women's Division I championship, scoring in regulation and the penalty kick shootout in the final, and was named the 2020–21 College Cup Offensive Most Outstanding Player. She had previously been named the 2017 West Coast Conference Freshman of the Year among other accolades. Following the title, Turnbow was named the TopDrawerSoccer National Player of the Year. Although the team fell in the semifinals of the 2021 College Cup, Turnbow was named a MAC Hermann Trophy finalist and First Team All-American.

Club career 
In the second round of the 2021 NWSL Draft, with the 18th overall pick, the Chicago Red Stars selected Turnbow from Santa Clara. However, Turnbow opted not to join the Red Stars for the 2021 NWSL season and returned to Santa Clara, where she led the team to the semifinals of the 2021 NCAA College Cup.

San Diego Wave FC 
In December 2021, the San Diego Wave Futbol Club announced it had acquired the rights to Mexican international Katie Johnson, Makenzy Doniak, and Turnbow in a trade with the Chicago Red Stars. Turnbow made her club debut in March 2022 as a starter in Wave FC's inaugural match against Angel City FC.

Turnbow recorded her first professional assist on April 17, 2022, during the 2022 NWSL Challenge Cup, on a goal by Jodie Taylor against Portland Thorns, and her first league assist on May 15, also to Taylor, against the Red Stars.

ESPN writer Jeff Kassouf included Turnbow as part of the league's best-ever rookie class, and cited her as a key midfielder and frequent leader of San Diego's pressing attack.

Honours 
Santa Clara Broncos
 NCAA Division I Women's Soccer Championship: 2020

Individual
 2017 West Coast Conference Freshman of the Year
 2020–21 NCAA College Cup Offensive Most Outstanding Player
 MAC Hermann Trophy finalist (2021)
 TopDrawerSoccer.com women's Player of the Year (2021)

References

External links 

 San Diego Wave profile
 NWSL profile
 Santa Clara profile
 
 

1999 births
Living people
Women's association football forwards
American women's soccer players
Soccer players from Scottsdale, Arizona
Santa Clara Broncos women's soccer players
National Women's Soccer League players
San Diego Wave FC players